In chemistry, a Haworth projection is a common way of writing a structural formula to represent the cyclic structure of monosaccharides with a simple three-dimensional perspective. Haworth projection approximate the shapes of the actual molecules better for furanoses -which are in reality nearly planar- than for pyranoses which exist in solution in the chair conformation. Organic chemistry and especially biochemistry are the areas of chemistry that use the Haworth projection the most.

The Haworth projection was named after the British chemist Sir Norman Haworth.

A Haworth projection has the following characteristics:
 Carbon is the implicit type of atom. In the example on the right, the atoms numbered from 1 to 6 are all carbon atoms. Carbon 1 is known as the anomeric carbon.
 Hydrogen atoms on carbon are implicit. In the example, atoms 1 to 6 have extra hydrogen atoms not depicted.
 A thicker line indicates atoms that are closer to the observer. In the example on the right, atoms 2 and 3 (and their corresponding OH groups) are the closest to the observer. Atoms 1 and 4 are farther from the observer. Atom 5 and the other atoms are the farthest.
The groups below the plane of the ring in Haworth projections correspond to those on the right-hand side of a Fischer projection. This rule does not apply to the groups on the two ring carbons bonded to the endocyclic oxygen atom.

See also 
 Skeletal formula
 Natta projection
 Newman projection

References 

Carbohydrate chemistry
Carbohydrates
Stereochemistry